Crystal Lake Township is a civil township of Benzie County in the U.S. state of Michigan. The population was 1,065 at the 2020 census.

Geography

Crystal Lake Township contains shores on both Lake Michigan and the eponymous Crystal Lake. Additionally, the Betsie River flows through the south of the township.

Communities 

 The city of Frankfort, the largest municipality in Benzie County, is immediately adjacent Crystal Lake Township.
 Pilgrim, a census-designated place, is located within the northwest of Crystal Lake Township.

Demographics
As of the census of 2000, there were 960 people, 414 households, and 303 families residing in the township. The racial makeup of the township was 98.02% White, 0.73% Native American, 0.62% Asian, and 0.62% from two or more races. Hispanic or Latino of any race were 0.73% of the population.

There were 414 households, out of which 25.8% had children under the age of 18 living with them, 63.5% were married couples living together, 6.3% had a female householder with no husband present, and 26.6% were non-families. 23.7% of all households were made up of individuals, and 11.6% had someone living alone who was 65 years of age or older.  The average household size was 2.31 and the average family size was 2.72.

In the township the population was spread out, with 20.5% under the age of 18, 4.5% from 18 to 24, 20.6% from 25 to 44, 29.9% from 45 to 64, and 24.5% who were 65 years of age or older.  The median age was 48 years. For every 100 females, there were 98.8 males.  For every 100 females age 18 and over, there were 95.6 males.

The median income for a household in the township was $36,528, and the median income for a family was $44,643. Males had a median income of $28,977 versus $20,982 for females. The per capita income for the township was $20,987.  About 4.9% of families and 5.3% of the population were below the poverty line, including 7.1% of those under age 18 and 4.2% of those age 65 or over.

References

External links
Crystal Lake Township official website

Townships in Benzie County, Michigan
Traverse City micropolitan area
Townships in Michigan
Michigan populated places on Lake Michigan